Eupinivora rufofascia is a species of moth of the family Tortricidae. It is found in the mountains of Durango in Mexico.

The length of the forewings is 9–10.5 mm for males and 10.5 mm for females. The ground colour of the forewings is pale rust with indistinct dark rust basal, median and subterminal fascia. The hindwings are greyish brown.

Larvae were reared on Pinus arizonica var. copperi.

Etymology
The species name refers to the nearly rust coloured fascia of the forewing.

References

Moths described in 2013
Cochylini